The 15 cm sIG 33 (Sf) auf Panzerkampfwagen 38(t), also known as Grille (German: "cricket") was a series of self-propelled artillery vehicles used by Nazi Germany during World War II. The Grille series was based on the Czech Panzer 38(t) tank chassis and used a 15 cm sIG 33 infantry gun.

Development
The original order for 200 units of the Grille, was to be based on the new 38(t) Ausf. M chassis that BMM (Böhmisch-Mährische Maschinenfabrik) was developing, however delays caused production to start on the 38(t) Ausf. H chassis.

Grille Ausf. H

The first variant of the Grille was based on the Panzer 38(t) Ausf. H chassis, which had its engine in the rear. Instead of a turret the vehicle had a low-slung superstructure and fighting compartment. The 15 cm schweres Infanteriegeschütz 33 (heavy infantry gun) was mounted in the front of this armored compartment. Being built on a tank chassis, its hull armour was 50 mm (front) and its superstructure armour was 25 mm (front)

A total of 200 (including one prototype) were produced in the BMM (erstwhile ČKD Praga) factory in Prague from February to June 1943, further 10 were built in November 1943. The official designation was 15 cm Schweres Infanteriegeschütz 33 (Sf) auf Panzerkampfwagen 38(t) Ausf. H (Sd.Kfz. 138/1).

Grille Ausf. K
The second Grille variant was based on the Ausf. M chassis which was specifically designed for self-propelled mounts. The engine was relocated to the center of the vehicle, permitting the gun to be mounted at the rear. The fighting compartment at the rear of the vehicle was somewhat smaller and higher than in the previous version. The main gun was also the 15 cm schweres Infanteriegeschütz 33.

From December 1943 to September 1944 a total of 162 vehicles were produced. Further 17 vehicles were built in 1945 for an overall production of 179.  The official designation was 15 cm Schweres Infanteriegeschütz 33/1 auf Selbstfahrlafette 38(t) (Sf) Ausf. M (Sd.Kfz. 138/1)

Ammunition carrier 
As the Grille had limited ammunition storage, a dedicated variant of the Grille Ausf. K was built as Munitionspanzer 38(t) (Sf) Ausf. K (Sd.Kfz. 138/1). It carried ammunition racks instead of the main gun but could be converted back to normal configuration in the field by mounting the 15 cm gun onto it. Production totaled 102 vehicles.

Combat history
Both versions were intended to take service in the schwere Infanteriegeschütz Companies within the Panzergrenadier regiments, inside Panzer and Panzergrenadier Divisions, in their heavy infantry gun units. Each detachment had six available.

Surviving vehicles 
 A "Grille" Ausf. K is in storage at the U.S. Army Artillery Museum at Fort Sill, USA.
 A Munitionspanzer 38(t) is on display at the U.S. Army Artillery Museum at Fort Sill, USA.

References

Bibliography 
 Chamberlain, Peter, and Hilary L. Doyle. Thomas L. Jentz (Technical Editor). Encyclopedia of German Tanks of World War Two: A Complete Illustrated Directory of German Battle Tanks, Armoured Cars, Self-propelled Guns, and Semi-tracked Vehicles, 1933–1945. London: Arms and Armour Press, 1978 (revised edition 1993).  ; rev. ed. .

Further reading 
 Trewhitt Philip, 1999, Armoured Fighting Vehicles, p 104

External links

World War II Vehicles
Gw. für 15 cm s.I.G. 33/1 (Sd. Kfz. 138/1): S.P. Heavy Infantry Howitzer (on Czech Chassis)  (Catalogue of Enemy Ordnance, 1945)

World War II self-propelled artillery of Germany
150 mm artillery
Military vehicles introduced from 1940 to 1944